The metropolitan area of the Bay of Algeciras is one of the nine Andalusian metropolitan areas identified in the Andalusian Territorial Planning Plan, which encompasses the seven municipalities concentrated around Campo de Gibraltar, located in the extreme south of the Iberian peninsula and that they add a population of over 260,000 inhabitants.

Urban area 
The urban area includes urbanized and almost contiguous nuclei, for residential or industrial use, which are on the coast of the bay of Algeciras and its immediate surroundings. They would be the municipalities of Algeciras, Los Barrios, San Roque (except the Guadiaro Valley district) and La Línea. Although it is outside the definition of the Junta de Andalucía, as it is outside its jurisdiction, the population of the British Overseas Territory of Gibraltar, located next to La Línea, is also part of the urban continuum.

The metropolitan area contains the urban area, adding the rest of the region. Approximately 90% of the population of the metropolitan area lives in the urban area. On the outskirts of the Bay of Algeciras we find, in a first level of distance, a series of population centers between ten and twenty kilometers from it, including Tarifa, Castellar de la Frontera, San Martín del Tesorillo, the Guadiaro Valley and the Secadero neighborhood belonging to the Malaga municipality of Casares. A second group of rural population centers appears over twenty kilometers from the Bay, highlighting Jimena de la Frontera and the towns of Facinas and Tahivilla, belonging to the municipality of Tarifa.

Other definitions for this urban agglomeration also include Gibraltar and even Ceuta, since these two cities, mainly Gibraltar, directly influence the economy and society of the area. Sometimes it is also called the Campo de Gibraltar metropolitan area. Therefore, if we included these two populations, the area would contain around 375,546 inhabitants, being one of the most many in Andalusia.

References

External links 
 DECREE 88/2007, of March 27, by which the formulation of the Plan for the Planning of the Territory of the Campo de Gibraltar Area is agreed. – Junta de Andalucía

See also 

 Campo de Gibraltar Metropolitan Transport Consortium
 Demography of Andalusia
 Gibraltar Field
 Annex: Metropolitan areas of Andalusia

San Roque, Cádiz
Jimena de la Frontera
La Línea de la Concepción
Tarifa
Los Barrios
Algeciras
Geography of the Province of Cádiz